Lori 1 Wind Farm is a wind farm in Armenia located along the Bazum Mountains at Pushkin Pass in Lori, Armenia.  It is the country's only wind farm. The wind farm consists of four 660-kW wind turbines and has a capacity of 2.64 MWe.  Completed in December 2005 by the Iranian company Sunir with US$3.2 million funding from Iran, it is owned by the High-Voltage Electric Networks of Armenia.  In 2006, the Lori 1 generated only 2.6 GWh of electricity (a yearly average of 296.8 KWe—about 11% of installed capacity).

The Armenian and Iranian authorities have agreed to expand the wind farm up to 90 MW.

References

Wind farms in Armenia
Armenia–Iran relations
Articles containing video clips